Nipped is a 1914 American short silent drama film directed by George Osborne and featuring Sessue Hayakawa, Tsuru Aoki, Mr. Yoshida and Frank Borzage in pivotal roles.

References

External links 
 

1914 drama films
1914 films
1914 short films
American silent short films
Silent American drama films
Films directed by George Osborne
American black-and-white films
1910s American films